Liv is a 1967 Norwegian drama film directed by Pål Løkkeberg. It was entered into the 17th Berlin International Film Festival.

Cast
Vibeke Løkkeberg as Liv
Per Theodor Haugen as photographer
Bente Børsum as Liv's friend
Geir Børresen as fiancé
Helen Brinchmann as bride
Dag Christensen
Helga Holdhus as the lady in the tobacco business
Tori Liseth as little girl
Elsa Lystad as lady in the window
Lars Nordrum as bride's dress maker
Henny Skjønberg as old lady
Hans Stormoen as father
Rolv Wesenlund as Hermansen

References

External links

1967 films
1967 drama films
Norwegian black-and-white films
Films directed by Pål Løkkeberg
1960s Norwegian-language films
Norwegian drama films